The Original Single Kollektion is a compilation album limited to 10,000 copies, released by German Neue Deutsche Härte band Rammstein. It was released in July 1998 and contains the first 6 singles of the band, as well as a poster. The cover art of the box set is similar to the East German coat of arms.

Track listing

Du riechst so gut 
Du riechst so gut (Single Version) - 4:50
Wollt ihr das Bett in Flammen sehen? - 5:19
Du riechst so gut (Scal Remix) - 4:45

Seemann 
Seemann - 4:48
Der Meister - 4:10
Rammstein in the House (Timewriter Rmx) - 6:24

Engel 
Engel - 4:23
Sehnsucht - 4:02
Rammstein (Eskimos & Egypt Radio Edit) - 3:41
Rammstein (Eskimos & Egypt Instrumental Edit) - 3:27
Rammstein - 4:25

Engel (Fan-Edition) 
Engel (Extended Version) - 4:34
Feuerräder (Live Demo Version 1994) - 4:47
Wilder Wein (Demo Version 1994) - 5:41
Rammstein (Eskimos & Egypt Instrumental) - 3:27

Du hast 
Du hast - 3:54
Bück dich - 3:21
Du hast (Remix by Jacob Hellner) - 6:44
Du hast (Remix by Clawfinger) - 5:24

Das Modell 
Das Modell - 4:46
Kokain - 3:09
Alter Mann (Special Version) - 4:22
Rammstein Computerspiel für Windows (video game for Windows)

Personnel

Rammstein
 Till Lindemann – lead vocals
 Richard Kruspe – lead guitar, backing vocals
 Paul Landers – rhythm guitar, backing vocals
 Oliver Riedel – bass guitar
 Christoph Schneider – drums, percussion
 Christian "Flake" Lorenz – keyboards, samples, synthesizers

Rammstein albums
1998 compilation albums